Kill Your Darlings may refer to:

 Kill Your Darlings (2006 film), a Swedish film
 Kill Your Darlings (album), a 2007 album by David Geraghty
 Kill Your Darlings (magazine), an Australian literary journal, launched in 2010
 Kill Your Darlings (2013 film), an American film